Alice Troughton is a British film and television director known for her work on Doctor Who and its spin-offs.

Career
From 2006 to 2010, Troughton directed episodes of each of Torchwood, The Sarah Jane Adventures, and Doctor Who. She was only the second person (after Colin Teague) to direct episodes of all three shows, which are set in a shared universe. Despite their shared surname and common association with Doctor Who, Troughton is not related to actor Patrick Troughton, who played the Second Doctor in the 1960s. Her directing in the franchise received positive reviews.

Filmography
Films

Television

References

External links
 
 An Interview with Alice Troughton on the Merlin Locations website

British television directors
British women television directors
Living people
Place of birth missing (living people)
Year of birth missing (living people)
Alumni of the University of Kent